Seýdi, formerly Neftezavodsk, is a city in Dänew District, Lebap Province, Turkmenistan.

Etymology
Neftezavodsk derives from two Russian words — neft  (нефть; oil) and zavod (завод; factory).

History 
The city was founded in 1973 with construction of the oil refinery; acc. to Russian census data, it was categorized as a "town of urban type". On 23 August 1990, it was upgraded to city, and renamed Seýdi in honor of Turkmen poet Seýitnazar Seýdi. On 25 November 2017, Seýdi was downgraded from a city with "district status" to a city "in a district" (i.e., subordinate to the district government).

Geography 
Seýdi lies on the edge of the Transuguz Desert, 70 kilometers NW of Türkmenabat on the left bank of the Amu Darya. The city houses the headquarters of the Amudarya State Nature Reserve, including a museum.

Economy 
The lifeline of the city remains the Seydi refinery, which was built during the late Soviet period to process oil, piped from Siberia; it remains one of Turkmenistan's only two oil refineries. Since the collapse of Soviet Union, the Seydi refinery has been reintegrated with the Kokdumalak, Yashyldepe, Yoloten, and Kerwen oil-fields. The unit processed about half a million tonnes of oil in 2020; among the products were gasoline, asphalt, and diesel.

References

Populated places in Lebap Region
Districts of Turkmenistan